Drayton House is a country house  south-west of the village of Lowick, Northamptonshire, England.

History

Aubrey de Vere I participated in the Norman conquest of England and was awarded the manor of Drayton near Northampton. In the early thirteenth century, Sir Walter de Vere dropped the "de Vere" family name, and assumed the surname "Drayton".

The core of the house was built by Sir Simon de Drayton around 1300 and still survives. He received his licence to crenellate in 1328. There have been changes to the house in each century since, including works recorded by Isaac Rowe, John Webb, William Talman, Gerard Lanscroon, William Rhodes, Alexander Roos, George Devey and John Alfred Gotch. However, the house is important for the transformation it underwent during the late 17th and early 18th centuries. There is a unique spiral cantilever oak staircase dating from around 1680 and an embroidered State Bed from 1700.

In 1770 the house passed to the Sackville family. Two rooms were redecorated in the Adam style. The house today preserves its medieval origins and the changes in the Baroque period, and is a family home. It is built of squared coursed limestone and limestone ashlar with lead and Collyweston stone slate roofs, and sits in large grounds known as Drayton Park.

James VI and I and Anne of Denmark came to Drayton in August 1605 and were entertained by musicians and singers. According to the queen's secretary, William Fowler, the guests included the Earls of Worcester, Devonshire, Northampshire, Sussex, and Salisbury, and the Duke of Lennox.

During the late 19th century the Drayton Park on the Drayton Estate was the host location for an early Victorian era tennis tournament called North Northamptonshire LTC Tournament organised by North Northamptonshire Lawn Tennis Club that was held between 1880 and 1883.

The house is open to groups of visitors by prior written appointment.

Principal owners of the house

Sir Simon de Drayton 1300 – 1357
John de Drayton 1358 
Baldwin de Drayton 1358 – 1362
Sir Henry Green 1362 – 1370 Chief Justice of the King's Bench
Sir Henry Green 1370 – 1399
Ralph Green 1400 – 1417
John Green 1417 – 1433
Henry Green 1433 – 1467
John Stafford, 1st Earl of Wiltshire 1467 – 1473
Edward Stafford, 2nd Earl of Wiltshire 1473 – 1498
John Mordaunt, 1st Baron Mordaunt 1515 – 1561 
John Mordaunt, 2nd Baron Mordaunt 1561 – 1571
Lewis Mordaunt, 3rd Baron Mordaunt 1571 – 1601
Henry Mordaunt, 4th Baron Mordaunt 1601 – 1610
John Mordaunt, 1st Earl of Peterborough 1610 – 1642
Henry Mordaunt, 2nd Earl of Peterborough 1642 – 1697
Mary Howard, 7th Baroness Mordaunt, and Sir John Germain, 1st Baronet 1697 – 1718
Elizabeth Germain 1718 – 1769
George Germain, 1st Viscount Sackville 1770 – 1785
Charles Sackville-Germain, 5th Duke of Dorset 1785 – 1843
William Bruce Stopford 1843 – 1872
Sackville Stopford-Sackville 1872 – 1926
Nigel Victor Stopford Sackville 1926 – 1972
Lionel Geoffrey Stopford Sackville 1972 – 1997
Charles Lionel Stopford Sackville 1997 – present

Main rooms
Late-thirteenth-century solar undercroft. 
Medieval Great Hall remodelled early in the eighteenth century by William Talman and decorated by Alexander Roos c.1850 to simulate marble. 
Dining room (originally the medieval buttery and pantry). Remodelled c.1771/74 by William Rhodes possibly to design by William Chambers. 
The Green Drawing Room, remodelled c.1773 by W. Rhodes
The Blue Drawing Room, with decoration by John Webb 
The State Bedroom remodelled c.1653 by John Webb. This room has a priest hole above it.
Lacquer closet off State Bedroom with panels of Chinese Coromandel screens 
The chapel 
The King's Dining Room (originally the medieval solar)
The library (originally the long gallery)

See also
 Noble Households – book with Drayton House inventories of 1710 and 1724

References

Country houses in Northamptonshire
Grade I listed buildings in Northamptonshire
Grade I listed houses
North Northamptonshire